Sauritinia is a genus of moths in the subfamily Arctiinae. It contains the single species Sauritinia dubiosa, which is found in French Guiana.

References

Natural History Museum Lepidoptera generic names catalog

Arctiinae